Hampton railway station, in the London Borough of Richmond upon Thames, is on the Shepperton branch line.

The station and all trains serving it are operated by South Western Railway.

Services

The typical weekday hourly service at the station is:

2 trains to London Waterloo via Kingston and Clapham Junction
2 trains from London Waterloo by that route.

Monday to Friday, four additional early morning rush-hour trains to Waterloo are routed via Twickenham and Richmond. Three additional evening rush-hour trains from Waterloo arrive via that route.

The Saturday service is as on other weekdays without the extra services routed via Twickenham. On Sundays the service is hourly.

History
The Shepperton branch opened to passengers on 1 November 1864. The original scheme intended that it would extend to a terminus on the Middlesex bank of the River Thames just east of Chertsey Bridge, but this plan was abandoned in 1862. The curve linking Fulwell and Teddington initially opened only to freight on 1 July 1894 and then carried passengers on 1 June 1901 as the replacement principal route, but selected for peak hours only by British Rail later.  The line was electrified on 30 January 1916.

Connections
London Buses routes 111 and 216 serve the station.

References

External links 

Railway stations in the London Borough of Richmond upon Thames
Former London and South Western Railway stations
Railway stations in Great Britain opened in 1864
Railway stations served by South Western Railway
1864 establishments in England